The Badr class is a class of corvette built by the United States and operated by the Saudi Navy. The class has been relegated to a coastal defence role following the modernisation of the Saudi fleet.

Design
In January 1972, Saudi Arabia signed an agreement with the United States to set up a 10-year programme to greatly enlarge the Saudi Navy, previously a small coastal patrol force. The programme envisaged the construction in the United States of a series of corvettes as well as other warships such as minesweepers and amphibious warfare ships. As part of this programme, on 30 August 1977, an order was placed with the Tacoma Boatbuilding Company of Tacoma, Washington for 4 missile-armed corvettes, with delivery expected between 1980 and 1981.

Principal anti-ship armament consists of eight Harpoon anti-ship missiles, with a gun armament of a single OTO Melara 76 mm gun forward, one Vulcan Phalanx close-in weapon system (CIWS) aft, two Oerlikon 20 mm cannon, an 81 mm mortar, and two 40 mm Mk 19 grenade launchers. Anti-submarine armament consisted of two triple Mark 32 Surface Vessel Torpedo Tubes for Mark 46 torpedoes. SPS-40B air search radar and SPS-55 navigation/surface search radars are carried, while a Mark 92 fire control radar is fitted above the ship's bridges. SQS-56 hull mounted sonar is carried to direct the ships' torpedo tubes.

Ships

References

Bibliography

External links

Corvette classes
Ships built by Tacoma Boatbuilding Company
Ships of the Royal Saudi Navy